{{Infobox person
| name          = Venus Terzo
| image         = 
| alt           = 
| caption       = 
| birth_name    = 
| birth_date    = 
| birth_place   = 
| death_date    = 
| death_place   =
| nationality   = Canadian
| occupation    = Actress 
| years_active  = 1987–present
| notable_works = {{Plainlist|
Beast Wars as Blackarachnia
Da Vinci's Inquest as Angela Kosmo
Ranma ½as Female Ranma Saotome
Gundam SEED Destiny as Talia Gladys
Vision of Escaflowne (Bandai Entertainment dub) as  Millerna Aston
X-Men: Evolution as  Jean Grey
}}
| spouse        = José Charbonneau
}}Venus Terzo' is a Canadian actress who played Detective Angela Kosmo in Da Vinci's Inquest and its spinoff, Da Vinci's City Hall. She was nominated in 2002 for the Gemini Award for Best Performance by an Actress in a Continuing Leading Dramatic Role in that same role. She also has voiced several roles in animated shows: Jean Grey in X-Men: Evolution, Blackarachnia in Beast Wars and Beast Machines, the female Ranma Saotome from Ranma ½. She was the voice of Rainbow Dash and Sparkleworks in the "Generation 3" My Little Pony DVDs, and voiced Rainbow Dash in My Little Pony Live.

Selected filmography

Film
 Hostage Negotiator - Skyscraper Marion Lane - Spectacular! Bonnie - Meltdown: Days of Destruction Barbarotious - Warriors of Virtue Spanish Woman's Daughter Ruby - Immediate Family Theresa Fernandez - Voyage of Terror Carla Browning - Painkiller Jane Susan Jennings - Circle of Friends Kathy - Echo Assistant - Born to Run Stacey - To Grandmother's House We Go Soap Opera Woman 1 - Laura Lansing Slept Here Sophie - American Boyfriends Isabelle Garcia - Behind the Camera: The Unauthorized Story of Mork and Mindy McKenzie - 12 Rounds 2: Reloaded Nettie - Murder She Baked: A Deadly Recipe Lani Tam - Hot Wheels World Race & Hot Wheels AcceleRacersTelevision
 Valeria Crossley - Psych 
 Angela Kosmo - Da Vinci's Inquest and Da Vinci's City Hall Monica Reynolds - Madison (4 episodes)
 Linda Pratt and Lena Graf - Viper episodes "People Like Us" and "On a Roll"
 Star and Sheila Brown - Mom P.I. episodes "The Shadows" and "Gumshoe"
 Melina Saris - Whistler episodes "The Burden of Truth" and "Scratching the Surface"
 Dr. Anna Rosoff and Spokeswoman - The Twilight Zone episode "The Pool Guy"
 Melinda and Elsie - 21 Jump Street episodes "Diplomas for Sale" and "Come from the Shadows"
 Valerie Sanducci - Street Legal, 14 episodes
 Dr. Elisa Schwartz - Arrow, 13 episodes
 Lillie Lightship - Tugs, 3 episodes
 Dr. Francine Michaels - Stargate SG-1, Season 6, Episode 4, 2002
 Rita Gallo - The Murders, 8 episodesOther Women's Children (television movie; 1993)
 Andrea Jills - The L Word, season 5 episode 1
 Cyndi - Stephen King's It (1990)

Animation
 Barbie: Mermaidia - Azura, & Purple Merfairy 
 The Barbie Diaries - Tia
 Barbie: Fairytopia - Azura
 Barbie: Fairytopia Magic of the Rainbow - Azura, and Pixie #1
 Death Note - Mary Kenwood a.k.a. Wedy
 Beast Wars: Transformers - Blackarachnia
 Beast Machines: Transformers - Blackarachnia
 Boys Over Flowers - Minako Yamano
 ReBoot - Gigagirl and Copygirl
 Barbie of Swan Lake - Lila the Unicorn
 The Adventures of T-Rex - Ginger and Mae
 Captain N: The Game Master - Princess Lana and Medusa
 Cardcaptors - Samantha Taylor
 Fantastic Four: World's Greatest Heroes - Lucia von Bardas
 Gintama° - Gintoki Sakata (Genderbend Form)
 Gundam Seed Destiny - Talia Gladys
 Hamtaro - Charlotte Yoshi 
 My Little Pony - Rainbow Dash and Sparkleworks
 The New Adventures of He-Man - Crita, Mara and Sorceress of Castle Grayskull
 Project A-Ko movies 2-6 - B-ko Daitokuji
 Ranma ½ - Ranma Saotome (female)
 Inuyasha the Movie: Affections Touching Across Time - Ruri
 Inuyasha: The Final Act - Spirit of Mount Azusa
 Saber Marionette J - Tiger
 Star Ocean EX - Celines Jules
 The Vision of Escaflowne (Bandai Entertainment dub) - Princess Millerna Aston 
 X-Men: Evolution - Jean Grey
 Devil Kings - Venus
 Kong: The Animated Series - Amina
 MegaMan NT Warrior - Aki
 Magic Knight Rayearth - Luce
 Captain Zed and the Zee Zone - P.J.
 Action Man - Agent Diana Zurvis
 Heroes on Hot Wheels - Hannah, Julie Wood and Ruth Wong
 Skysurfer Strike Force - Lazerette and Myko
 King Arthur and the Knights of Justice - Lady Elaine
 The Adventures of Mowgli - Mother Wolf
 Sleeping Beauty - Misc
 Bucky O'Hare and the Toad Wars - Princess Katrina
 Darkstalkers - Mariko
 Project ARMS - Katsumi Akagi
 A Chinese Ghost Story: The Tsui Hark Animation - Siu Deep
 Master Keaton - Sophia
 G.I. Joe: Valor vs. Venom and G.I. Joe: Ninja Battles - Jinx
 Mobile Suit Gundam - Jacqueline Simone 
 My Little Pony Tales - Dazzle and Patch
 Vor-Tech: Undercover Conversion Squad - Miranda Ortiz/Firefly
 Eat-Man '98 - Detective Amie
 Heaven's Fire - Michelle
 The SoulTaker - Olivia Carlisle
 Trouble Chocolate - Deborah and Mecha-Deborah 
 Street Fighter - La Lupa
 Kishin Corps: Alien Defender Geo-Armor - Lt. Yoshiko Fujishima
 Human Crossing - Ryoko Wakabayashi 
 Dokkoida?! - Marilyn Ranmoe
 The Little Prince - Marieke
 Pocket Dragon Adventures - Cuddles
 Stories From My Childhood, Goodtimes Fairy Tales, Littlest Pet Shop, The New Adventures of Kimba The White Lion, Funky Fables and Fat Dog Mendoza - Various Characters 
 A Christmas Adventure ...From a Book Called Wisely's Tales - Dancer
 Mega Man - Female Patrons and Funworld Employee 
 Heroes on Hot Wheels - Hanna, Ruth and Julie Woods 
 Being Ian - Adam and Bernadette
 Tico of the Seven Seas'' - Cheryl Christina Melville

References

External links

Living people
Canadian film actresses
Canadian television actresses
Canadian voice actresses
Year of birth missing (living people)
20th-century Canadian actresses
21st-century Canadian actresses